Kasey Wehrman (born 16 August 1977) is an Australian footballer. Wehrman has Indigenous Australian ancestry.

Club career
Born in Cloncurry, having impressed as a youth player with the Queensland Academy of Sport, Wehrman signed with National Soccer League club Brisbane Strikers, and was an integral member of their premiership team in 1996–97, where he was crowned the Under 21 Player of the Year. After four seasons with the Strikers, he transferred to Perth Glory in 1999, where he helped the club win the Minor Premiership in his first season.

With two seasons in Perth, Wehrman sought a move overseas, and after successful trials in Norway, he signed with Moss. He settled into first team football almost immediately, becoming a mainstay in the Moss midfield. After the club was relegated in 2002, Wehrman signed with Lillestrøm where he featured for the next four seasons, before transferring to Fredrikstad in 2007.

On 31 August he signed a loan deal with Lyn for the 2009 season. On 19 October 2009 reports suggested that Kasey was to move to Preston North End as a free agent. On 8 April 2010, it was announced that Wehrman had signed a two-year deal with the Newcastle Jets, returning to Australia after eight years abroad. After speaking out publicly against the Jet's coach Gary van Egmond, Wehrman's was taken out of the squad, and never took to the field for the Jets again.

International career
Wehrman was capped 11 times for the Australian under-20 team and has played a number of times for the full Australian national team including unofficial and official international games making his debut in 1998 against Fiji in Brisbane. 
He was a surprise inclusion for a friendly match against Ghana in November 2006 after having been overlooked for the previous 5 years.

National team statistics

Coaching career
On 25 October 2012 it was announced he had accepted the head coach position at the newly formed Western Pride football club who will participate in the Australian Premier League Queensland Conference. He resigned in July 2014 to return home to Norway after two seasons at Ipswich.

On 15 December 2021, Wehrman was named head coach of Norwegian side Strømmen IF.

Honours

Club
Brisbane Strikers:
 NSL Championship: 1996-1997

Country
Australia
 OFC U-20 Championship: 1997

Individual
 NSL Under-21 Player of the Year: 1996-1997
 PFA A-League Team of the Season: 2010–11

References

External links
 Newcastle Jets profile
  Fredrikstad FK profile
 KaseyWehrman at Aussie Footballers
 

1977 births
Living people
People from Cloncurry, Queensland
Australian soccer players
Indigenous Australian soccer players
Australian expatriate soccer players
Australia international soccer players
Australia under-20 international soccer players
Olympic soccer players of Australia
Brisbane Strikers FC players
Fredrikstad FK players
Lillestrøm SK players
Moss FK players
Perth Glory FC players
Eliteserien players
A-League Men players
Newcastle Jets FC players
1998 OFC Nations Cup players
Footballers at the 2000 Summer Olympics
Expatriate footballers in Norway
Australian expatriate sportspeople in Norway
Indigenous Australian Olympians
Association football midfielders
Fredrikstad FK non-playing staff
Australian soccer coaches
Australian expatriate soccer coaches